The EMD GP22ECO is a  B-B diesel-electric locomotive rebuilt by Electro-Motive Diesel and Norfolk Southern's Juniata Shops. Initially EMD built two GP22ECO demonstrators, one based on a GP9 and one based on a GP40, but thus far all orders have been for conversions based on EMD GP40 and EMD GP40-2 series locomotives. The rebuild involves replacing the existing prime mover with an EPA Tier-II-compliant turbocharged V8 710G3A, with Electronic fuel injection. The prime mover is mated to an AR10 alternator for traction power, a CA6 alternator for control power, and a computerized control system. Applying this to a 6-axle locomotive results in a SD22ECO. Some 6-axle locomotives could alternately be converted into a SD32ECO, using a  V12 instead.

When applied to GP40 or GP40-2 series locomotives, this conversion does not alter the external appearance of the locomotive, although the conversion of the GP9-based demonstrator required extensive changes to the long hood. The GP22ECO offers customers a 'factory' upgrade of existing locomotives.

Norfolk Southern's units were rebuilt from GP38AC units. They also feature electrical, mechanical, and emissions improvements.

References

External links 

 

B-B locomotives
GP22ECO
Electro-Motive Division locomotives
Diesel-electric locomotives of the United States
EPA Tier 2-compliant locomotives of the United States
Rebuilt locomotives
Standard gauge locomotives of the United States